Pyrgocythara plicosa, common name the plicate mangelia, is a species of sea snail, a marine gastropod mollusk in the family Mangeliidae.

Description
The size of the shell varies between 6 mm and 13 mm.

Distribution
P. plicosa can be found in Atlantic and Caribbean waters, ranging from the coast of Massachusetts south to Panama. Fossils have been found in Quaternary strata of the United States (Florida, New Jersey) age range: 0.126 to 0.012 Ma.

References

 * Adams, C.B. (1840) Descriptions of thirteen new species of shells of New England. Journal of the Boston Society of Natural History, 3, 318–332, pl. 3
 Adams, C. B. 1850. Description of supposed new species of marine shells which inhabit Jamaica. Contributions to Conchology, 4: 56–68, 109–123
 Abbott, R.T. (1974). American Seashells. 2nd ed. Van Nostrand Reinhold: New York, NY (USA). 663 pp.
 Rosenberg, G., F. Moretzsohn, and E. F. García. 2009. Gastropoda (Mollusca) of the Gulf of Mexico, Pp. 579–699 in Felder, D.L. and D.K. Camp (eds.), Gulf of Mexico–Origins, Waters, and Biota. Biodiversity. Texas A&M Press, College Station, Texas

External links
   Pollock, L.W. (1998). A practical guide to the marine animals of northeastern North America. Rutgers University Press. New Brunswick, New Jersey & London. 367 pp
 

plicosa
Gastropods described in 1850
Taxa named by Charles Baker Adams